Josef Franz Anton Graf von Auersperg (31 January 1734, Vienna – 21 August 1795, Passau) was an Austrian bishop, prince bishop of Passau and cardinal.

References

1734 births
1795 deaths
18th-century Austrian cardinals
Clergy from Vienna
Roman Catholic bishops of Passau
Bishops of Lavant